Lewis Simper (born 3 September 2001) is an English professional footballer currently playing as a midfielder for Cambridge United.

Career statistics

Honours
Concord Rangers
FA Trophy runner-up: 2019–20

References

2001 births
Living people
English footballers
Association football midfielders
Southern Football League players
National League (English football) players
English Football League players
Cambridge United F.C. players
St Neots Town F.C. players
Concord Rangers F.C. players
Yeovil Town F.C. players